Roger Coggio (11 March 1934 – 22 October 2001) was a French actor, film director and screenwriter. He appeared in 40 films between 1954 and 1998. He was married to actress Pascale Audret. He died of cancer.

Selected filmography
 Before the Deluge (1954)
 Girl on the Road (1962)
 The Immortal Story (1968)
 Belle (1973)
 La dernière bourrée à Paris (1973)
 C'est encore loin l'Amérique ? (1980)
 Le bourgeois gentilhomme (1981)
 Monsieur de Pourceaugnac (1985)

References

External links

1934 births
2001 deaths
French male film actors
French film directors
French male screenwriters
20th-century French screenwriters
Deaths from cancer in France
Mass media people from Lyon
20th-century French male writers